The 1080s was a decade of the Julian Calendar which began on January 1, 1080, and ended on December 31, 1089.

Significant people
 Al-Muqtadi caliph of Baghdad
 Pope Gregory VII
 Malik-Shah I Seljuk sultan
 Nizam al-Mulk
 Pope Victor III
 Pope Urban II

References